Uszyce  (German Uschütz) is a village in the administrative district of Gmina Gorzów Śląski, within Olesno County, Opole Voivodeship, in south-western Poland.

Prior to 1945 it was in Germany.

Notable residents
 Emanuel Kania (1827-1887), Polish composer born in Uszyce
 Gertrude Guillaume-Schack (1845–1903), German women's rights activist

References

Uszyce